Fibroblast growth factor receptor oncogene partner 2 (FGFR1OP2) was identified in a study on myeloproliferative syndrome (EMS). The study aimed to identify the partner genes to the fibroblast growth factor receptor 1 (FGFR1) involved in the syndrome. Using the 5'-RACE PCR technique, FGFR1OP2 was identified as a novel gene with no known function.

Function 

FGFR1OP2, when fused with the fibroblast growth factor receptor 1 (FGFR1), is shown to cause myeloproliferative syndrome. The protein encoded by the FGFR1 gene belongs to the fibroblast growth factor receptor family. FGFRs usually contain an extracellular ligand binding domain, a single transmembrane domain, and an intracellular tyrosine kinase domain. The extracellular domain specifies which ligand the receptor will bind to and mediates ligand-induced receptor dimerization. When FGFR1OP2 is fused to FGFR1, it may exhibit constitutive kinase activity. Furthermore, FGFR1OP2 is possibly involved in some steps of the wound healing pathway.

Evolutionary Biology 

The following tables compare the Homo sapiens FGFR1OP2 gene and protein to orthologs. In both of the following tables, the divergence from the Homo sapiens FGFR1OP2 gene or protein to the ortholog was found using TimeTree. Ortholog mRNA and protein sequences were found using NCBI's BLAST   and UCSC's BLAT Tool. The accession numbers, as well as the sequence length and the sequence similarity were compiled using BLAST.

The mRNA orthologs sequence similarity to Homo sapiens FGFR1OP2 was graphed as a function of time in order to show how the FGFR1OP2 gene has changed over time. The graph is depicted on the right.

The table below shows the protein orthologs to the Homo sapiens FGFR1OP2 protein. FGFR1OP2 is conserved in all clades of the animal kingdom, as seen in the table below.

Gene 

There are three transcript variants for the FGFR1OP2 gene, with the first being the longest.  FGFR1OP2 is also known as HSPC123-like protein (HSPC123L) and wound inducible transcript 3.0 (wit3.0).

Locus 

The Homo sapiens FGFR1OP2 gene is located on chromosome 12, with its specific locus being 12p11.23. The Homo sapiens asunder spermatogenesis regulator (ASUN) gene (NCBI Reference Sequence NM_018164.2) is located directly upstream from FGFR1OP2. The ASUN gene is a regulator of development and the mitotic cell cycle. The Homo sapiens transmembrane 7 superfamily member 3 (TM7SF3) gene is located slightly downstream from FGFR1OP2.

Promoter

Protein 

There are three isoforms of the FGFR1OP2 protein. Transcript variant 1 consists of 253 amino acids and weighs 29.4 kilodaltons. FGFR1OP2's isoelectric point is 5.61. The FGFR1OP2 protein does not have a signal sequences, and therefore is not secreted.

Domains 

FGFR1OP2 has a domain of unknown function, designated DUF837.

Protein Structure 

Using the PELE program of Biology WorkBench the protein sequence of FGFR1OP2 was analyzed, and FGFR1OP2 appears to be completely composed of alpha helices. No structural models for the Homo sapiens FGFR1OP2 protein could be found, but the Mus musculus FGFR1OP2 protein's structure can be seen below.

Expression 

The expression of FGFR1OP2 was analyzed via the Gene Expression Omnibus at NCBI. The following are findings from the Gene Expression Onmibus database:
There is a slightly elevated expression level of FGFR1OP2 in pulmonary sarcoidosis, suggesting FGFR1OP2 operates in part of the wound healing pathway.
FGFR1OP2 is strongly upregulated when compared to the control in an increased immune response triggered by the VAF347 ligand. FGFR1OP2 is upregulated in the monocyte derived dendritic cell response to the VAF347 ligand. VAF347 activates the aryl hydrocarbon receptor and acts on monocytes and naive CD4+ Th cells to promote development of IL-22 secreting Th cells. 
Langerhans cells show decreased expression of FGFR1OP2 with the null aryl hydrocarbon receptor (ligand is VAF347) in Mus musculus. 
The gene is also highly expressed compared to control samples in monocytopenia. 
It is expressed in cases of leukemia; it may have a linkage to the disease. 
FGFR1OP2 shows low expression levels in septic splenocytes in Mus musculus. 
FGFR1OP2 is expressed in fetal reticulocytes but not adult reticulocytes, suggesting it may play a role in the development of red blood cells.

Interactions 

Using the STRING database and Gene Cards, proteins that possibly interact with FGFR1OP2 were identified, and they are shown in the table below.

Clinical Significance 

Single-nucleotide polymorphisms (SNPs) in the FGFR1OP2 gene were found to lead to edentulism in the mandible of a small Korean population (134 subjects aged 60–80 years). Also, when FGFR1OP2 is fused to FGFR1, 8p11 myeloproliferative syndrome can result.

References

External links

 Homo sapiens FGFR1 oncogene partner 2 (FGFR1OP2), transcript variant 1, mRNA (NCBI)
 Homo sapiens FGFR1 oncogene partner 2 isoform 1 (NCBI)

Genes on human chromosome 12